The Romantic Swordsman is a Hong Kong television series adapted from Gu Long's novel Duoqing Jianke Wuqing Jian of the Xiaoli Feidao Series. It was released overseas in September 1994 and broadcast on TVB in Hong Kong in September 1995.

Cast
 Note: Some of the characters' names are in Cantonese romanisation.

 Eddie Kwan as Lei Cham-fan
 Gigi Fu as Lam Sin-yee
 Emily Kwan as Lam See-yan
 Chin Kar-lok as Ah-fei
 Wong Lung-wai as Plum Flower Bandit
 Chan Chit-man as Lung Siu-wan
 Tang Siu-chun as Lung Tin-chi
 Leung Yam-kei as Sheung-koon Kam-hung
 Wong Siu-yin as Suen Siu-hong

See also
 The Sentimental Swordsman
 The Romantic Swordsman (1978 TV series)
 Flying Daggers

1995 Hong Kong television series debuts
TVB dramas
Hong Kong wuxia television series
Works based on Xiaoli Feidao (novel series)
Television shows based on works by Gu Long